Emine Sultan ("benign" or "trusthworthy"; 24 August 1874 – 29 January 1920) was an Ottoman princess, the daughter of Ottoman Sultan Abdulaziz and Neşerek Kadın.

Early life
Emine Sultan was born on 24 August 1874 in at the Dolmabahçe Palace. Her father was Sultan Abdulaziz, son of Sultan Mahmud II and Pertevniyal Sultan and her mother was Neşerek Kadın, the daughter of Prince Ismail Zevş-Barakay. She was the second child of her mother. She was named after her half-sister from one of her father's other consort, who died in infancy. She was the younger full sister of Şehzade Mehmed Şevket. 

Her father, Abdulaziz was deposed by his ministers on 30 May 1876, his nephew Murad V became the Sultan. He was transferred to Feriye Palace the next day. The women of Abdulaziz's entourage didn't wanted to leave the Dolmabahçe Palace. So they were grabbed by hand and were send out to the Feriye Palace. In the process, they were searched from head to toe and everything of value was taken from them. On 4 June 1876, Abdulaziz died under mysterious circumstances.

Her mother died a few days later, on 11 June 1876. She had become seriously ill the night of the deposition, when she was dragged under the storm naked with only a shawl on, because she had tried to hide the jewels under her clothes. Plus, she was heartbroken over Abdülaziz's death, and she was sure he had been killed. when Emine Sultan was not yet two years old, her older brother the crown prince Şehzade Yusuf Izzeddin raised her in his household.

Marriage
Sultan Abdul Hamid II decided that his son Şehzade Mehmed Abdülkadir would marry Emine Sultan, however she abominated this decision and repudiated it as she didn't wanted to form a marriage with someone younger than her, although the Sultan considered this pertinent. 

In 1901, Abdul Hamid arranged her trousseaux and marriage together with two of Sultan Murad V daughters, princesses Hatice Sultan and Fehime Sultan. At the age of twenty seven, she married Mehmed Şerif Pasha on 12 September 1901 in the Yıldız Palace. Mehmed Şerif Pasha was a scholar was familiar with oriental history and literature, he was known for his translations. The couple were given the palace of Mehmed Sadık Pasha located in Çarşıkapı. The marriage was very Happy and they had a daughter, Hamide Hanımsultan. 

In January 1910, Emine and her husband assisted Kemal Bey, alias Ahmed Fehmi Bey in organising the Parti Radical Ottoman in Istanbul. Branches of this organisation were established in Bursa and some other Anato lian towns. Soon after the extension of their activities within the empire, the government had become fully aware of the movements of the plotters, and started gathering intelligence as to their contacts in the empire.

Death
Emine Sultan died on 29 January 1920 in Istanbul, after a short illness. Her husband was grief-stricken and devasted and composed a marsiya (an elegiac poem) in her honour, Gülşen-i adn-i perıah etdi Emine Sultan.  She was forty five and was buried in the mausoleum of Sultan Mahmud II, Divanyolu, Istanbul.

Issue
By her marriage, Emine Sultan had a daughter:
Hamide Hanımsultan. Since she does not appear to have married, she probably died a child.

Honours

 Order of the House of Osman
 Order of the Medjidie, Jeweled
 Order of Charity, 1st Class

Ancestry

See also
 List of Ottoman princesses

References

Sources

 
 
 

1874 births
1920 deaths
Royalty from Istanbul
19th-century Ottoman princesses
20th-century Ottoman princesses